The Cuban Athletics Federation (FCA: Federación Cubana de Atletismo) is the governing body for the sport of athletics in Cuba.  Current president is Alberto Juantorena.  He was re-elected in December 2010.

History 
FCA was founded in 1922 as Unión Atlética Amateur de Cuba (UAAC) and was affiliated to the IAAF in 1924.  UAAC dissolved in 1961, and was replaced by the Federación Cubana de Atletismo.

Affiliations 
FCA is the national member federation for Cuba in the following international organisations:
World Athletics
North American, Central American and Caribbean Athletic Association (NACAC)
Association of Panamerican Athletics (APA)
Asociación Iberoamericana de Atletismo (AIA; Ibero-American Athletics Association)
Central American and Caribbean Athletic Confederation (CACAC)
Moreover, it is part of the following national organisations:
Cuban Olympic Committee (COC; Comité Olímpico Cubano)

National records 
FCA maintains the Cuban records in athletics.

References

External links 
FCA on Facebook (in Spanish)

Cuba
Athletics in Cuba
Sports governing bodies in Cuba
1922 establishments in Cuba
Sports organizations established in 1922
National governing bodies for athletics